The Radical-Socialist Party Camille Pelletan (PRS-CP) was a social liberal party in France founded in 1934 at the Clermont-Ferrand Congress of the Radical-Socialist Party as a reaction to the participation of Radicals in the right-wing Gaston Doumergue cabinet. The PRS-CP was led by Gabriel Cudenet but never achieved any lasting success. In fact, only 3 parliamentarians identified with the PRS-CP in the 16th legislature (1936–1940). Most members rejoined the Radical Party post-war.

Defunct political parties in France
Radical parties in France
Republican parties
Political parties of the French Third Republic
Socialist parties in France
Social liberal parties